Cuthbert "Chris" Barrass (11 February 1898 – 13 October 1978) was an English professional footballer who played as an inside forward.

References

1898 births
1978 deaths
People from South Shields
English footballers
Association football inside forwards
Pandon Temperance F.C. players
Jarrow F.C. players
Grimsby Town F.C. players
English Football League players